The 2005 Maryland Terrapins football team represented the University of Maryland in the 2005 NCAA Division I FBS football season. It was the Terrapins' 53rd season as a member of the Atlantic Coast Conference (ACC) and its first within the framework of the ACC Atlantic Division. Ralph Friedgen led the team for his fifth season as head coach.

Schedule

2006 NFL Draft
The following players were selected in the 2006 NFL Draft.

References

Maryland
Maryland Terrapins football seasons
Maryland Terrapins football